William Ward (born 4 March 1986) is a former New Zealand tennis player. He reached the height of his career on the junior circuit in 2004 with a ranking of 24 in the world, then went to college in USA before retiring from playing at only 23 after finishing his study at the University of Kentucky in 2009. He started coaching in 2013, he coaches players Michael Venus and Finn Tearney.

Career 
Ward started his junior tennis career in 2000 at the age of 14. He played his first grade 1 tournament in March 2003, his first grade B tournament in August 2003, and his first grade A tournament, the highest junior tournament level, in October 2003. In March 2004 he was ranked among the top 30 in the junior circuit and was selected to represent New Zealand in the 2004 Davis Cup, he only competed in one game at the Davis Cup Indonesia at the first round playoffs in April, at the second round playoffs in Pakistan he was promised selection by the Davis Cup captain after playing US Open Juniors where he made the third round, however, once arriving in Pakistan he was not selected to play and this resulted with William Ward and the Davis Cup captain being in disagreement with each other over the selection process. Earlier in the year he competed in the quarterfinals at 2004 Wimbledon boys' singles and was the top ranked New Zealand junior at the end of the year. He retired from tennis in 2009. He started coaching in 2013, coaching players Michael Venus, who won the 2017 French Open men's doubles, and Finn Tearney. He was also a member of the board of directors for Tennis NZ until 2021.

Davis Cup 

   indicates the outcome of the Davis Cup match followed by the score, date, place of event, the zonal classification and its phase, and the court surface.

ITF Futures finals

Doubles: 2 (0–2)

ITF World Tennis Tour Juniors

Singles: 2 (2 runners-up)

Doubles: 3 (2 titles, 1 runner-up)

See also 
 New Zealand Davis Cup team

References 

Living people
1986 births
New Zealand male tennis players
Tennis players from Auckland